ATT Chesterfield is a former facility owned by AT&T that was operational from the 1970s to the early 1990s. It was the location of a planned fallout shelter for Julie Nixon, who was attending Smith College at the time.

The location still exists and is being reused by a business.

References

External links
Site images

AT&T buildings
Buildings and structures in Northampton, Massachusetts